Flystrike in sheep is a myiasis condition, in which domestic sheep are infected by one of several species of flies which are external parasites of sheep.  Sheep are particularly susceptible to flystrike because their thick wool, if sufficiently contaminated with urine and faecal material, can provide effective breeding ground for maggots even in the relative absence of wounds.

Causes
Flystrike in sheep is a condition where parasitic flies lay eggs on soiled wool or open wounds. After hatching, the maggots bury themselves in the sheep's wool and eventually under the sheep's skin, feeding off their flesh. Once the larvae develop, flies continue to deposit eggs on to new or already infected sheep, starting the infection process over again. Sheep display symptoms such as agitation, loss of appetite, odour and matted wool, many of which further encourage the attraction of flies. Fly strike can be lethal for sheep due to ammonia poisoning.

Fly strike is problematic, not only causing loss or degradation of stock, but also requiring expenditure of both money and time for effective management. In Australia, Lucilia cuprina causes about 90% of infestations, and Chrysomya rufifacies is the most common secondary pest that targets wounds caused by L. cuprina.

Identification of infected sheep

Flystruck sheep are identified in the flock by characteristic green or wet-looking patches in the sheep's fleece, usually around the haunches or tail, or at the site of an open wound, where wool can create a damper area which is more attractive to flies. In male sheep the penile region is also a common area for fly strike to occur. When the flock settle, infected sheep will display signs of agitation, such as foot stamping or turning to nibble their body. Flystruck animals often have a strong characteristic odour and in severe cases, the wet-looking wool can begin to shed.

The peak UK green bottle fly breeding season tends to be in late June or July, but fly strike can occur at any time warm damp conditions prevail and green bottles are active.

Prevention

There are several preventative measures which are used to reduce the occurrence of flystrike in sheep flocks, these include:
 Controlling intestinal parasites to prevent scours and a suitable surface for flystrike
 Scheduled shearing and crutching
 Removing the tails of lambs at weaning
 Mulesing
 Preventative chemical treatments before fly infestation risk is high
 Breeding for traits that reduce the likelihood of infestation
 Removing or avoiding large manure heaps or other sites attractive to the flies
 Using fly traps near the flock to attract and kill any local flies, helping to minimise the local populations.  NB: Traps often emit a pungent smell and are best placed away from human activity.

None of these measures completely stop the occurrence of fly strike in sheep, and regular treatment is still necessary.

See also
 Mange
 Sarcoptes scabiei
 Sheep dip

References

Flies and humans
Sheep and goat diseases
Arthropod infestations
Veterinary entomology
Parasitic infestations, stings, and bites of the skin